Southwick Lake is a lake in the U.S. state of Washington.

Southwick Lake was named after James Southwick, the proprietor of a lakeside resort.

References

Lakes of Thurston County, Washington